Elkhart Band Instrument Company was a musical instrument manufacturer in Elkhart, Indiana.

History
The company was founded in 1923 by Andrew Hubble Beardsley (b Dayton Ohio 25 September 1864; d New York NY 10 October 1936), who was the president of Buescher Band Instrument Company, and Carl Dimond Greenleaf (b Wauseon, Ohio 27 July 1876; d Elkhart 10 July 1959), president of C.G. Conn, and who served the new company as secretary-treasurer. The company produced "Elkhart" branded band instruments as well instruments to be sold under merchandisers' brands ("stencil" instruments).  Instruments produced by the company had an irregular assortment of features borrowed from the products of Conn and Buescher, partners in the consortium.

In 1927 the company merged with Buescher (some maintain that Buescher was purchased by Elkhart Band Instrument Company). When Beardsley died in 1936, the company was dissolved and Buescher used the Elkhart trademark for student line instruments until 1959.

References
Elkhart city directories (available Elkhart Public Library)
McMakin, Dean "Musical Instrument Manufacturing in Elkhart, Indiana" (unpublished typescript, 1987, available at Elkhart Public Library)
The Elkhart Truth, Monday 12 October 1936, obituary for Andrew Hubble Beardsley
New Grove Music Dictionary ("Buescher")

Manufacturing companies based in Indiana
Companies based in Elkhart County, Indiana
Musical instrument manufacturing companies of the United States
Brass instrument manufacturing companies
Manufacturing companies established in 1923
Manufacturing companies disestablished in 1927